Raphael Hofer (born 14 February 2003) is an Austrian professional footballer who plays as a forward for 2. Liga club Liefering.

Career statistics

Club

Notes

References

2003 births
Living people
Austrian footballers
Association football forwards
2. Liga (Austria) players
FC Red Bull Salzburg players
FC Liefering players